Samina Noor (born 13 July 1986) is a Pakistani politician who had been a Member of the Provincial Assembly of the Punjab, from May 2013 to May 2018.

Early life and education
Noor was born on 13 July 1986 in Okara.

She received the degree of Bachelor of Arts (Hons) from Lahore College for Women University in 2010.

Political career

She was elected to the Provincial Assembly of the Punjab as a candidate for Pakistan Muslim League (N) for Constituency PP-185 (Okara-I) in 2013 Pakistani general election. She received 26,900 votes and defeated an independent candidate, Malik Muhammad Akram Bhatti.

References

Living people
Women members of the Provincial Assembly of the Punjab
Punjab MPAs 2013–2018
1986 births
Pakistan Muslim League (N) politicians
People from Okara, Pakistan
Lahore College for Women University alumni
21st-century Pakistani women politicians